The Villa Romée is a historic mansion in Cannes. It was built in 1928 for Marcelle Aron, the widow of Jacques Isidore Gompel, a World War I veteran. It was designed by architects Georges-Henri Pingusson and Paul Furiet. The garden was built in 1929. Aron sold the house in 1935. It has been listed as an official historical monument since 1994.

References

Houses completed in 1928
Monuments historiques of Cannes
20th-century architecture in France